Mark S. Fowler (born October 6, 1941) served as chair of the Federal Communications Commission from May 18, 1981 to April 17, 1987. Appointed by Ronald Reagan, he led repeal of the Fairness Doctrine and spearheaded the deregulatory trend in telecommunications policy, and was a proponent of deregulation of television stations, and radio ownership laws.

Fowler was born in Toronto, Ontario, Canada. He received both his Bachelor's degree and Juris Doctor from the University of Florida.

Career after the FCC
Fowler was a communications counsel at the law firm of Latham & Watkins LLP from 1987 until 2000 FCC. He was a VP at Bell South while forming his own international phone company Power Fon, which was bought out by a large phone carrier. From 1990 to 1993 Mr. Fowler also served on the board of directors for Eon Corporation, then doing business as TV Answer. TV Answer was one of the first companies to work with the FCC to explore the use of narrow band radio-wave frequencies for interactive television—where programmers and their viewers could communicate back and forth through a small device attached to a television set.
He has been a director of Beasley Broadcast Group, Inc. since February 2000. From 2006–8, his compensation as director was close to $50,000 annually; in 2009 it fell to about $20,000. He served as a director of TalkAmerica, Inc., a publicly held company until the company was sold in December 2006. Mr. Fowler also served as chairman of AssureSat, Inc., a satellite services provider that he co-founded in 1997 until the company was dissolved in December 2004.

References

External links

1941 births
Living people
Chairmen of the Federal Communications Commission
Fredric G. Levin College of Law alumni
People from Toronto
University of Florida alumni
Reagan administration personnel